Ikehara Dam is an arch dam located in Nara prefecture in Japan. The dam is used for power production. The catchment area of the dam is 300 km2. The dam impounds about 843  ha of land when full and can store 338373 thousand cubic meters of water. The construction of the dam was started on 1962 and completed in 1964.

References

Dams in Nara Prefecture
1964 establishments in Japan